Pterolophia gardneri is a species of beetle in the family Cerambycidae. It was described by Bernhard Schwarzer in 1931.

References

gardneri
Beetles described in 1931